Andries 'Boeboes' Coetzee (born 1 March 1990) is a South African rugby union player for the  in United Rugby Championship. He usually plays as a fullback.

He played for Benetton in United Rugby Championship in 2021−22 season.

In 2017 Coetzee played for the South Africa squad.

References

External links
 
 itsrugby.co.uk profile
Ultimate Rugby Profile

1990 births
Living people
People from Bethal
Afrikaner people
South African rugby union players
Golden Lions players
Lions (United Rugby Championship) players
Sharks (rugby union) players
Rugby union fullbacks
South Africa international rugby union players
Hanazono Kintetsu Liners players
Benetton Rugby players
Rugby union players from Mpumalanga